Boris Iván Pérez Ulloa (born 7 June 1989) is a Chilean former footballer who played as a goalkeeper.

Career
A product of Audax Italiano youth system, where he came at the age of thiteen, he also played for Everton, Deportes Melipilla and Unión San Felipe.

Abroad, he had a brief stint with Brazilian side Água Santa in 2016.

References

External links
 
 Boris Pérez at PlaymakerStats.com

1989 births
Living people
People from Puerto Natales
Chilean footballers
Chilean expatriate footballers
Audax Italiano footballers
Everton de Viña del Mar footballers
Deportes Melipilla footballers
Esporte Clube Água Santa players
Unión San Felipe footballers
Chilean Primera División players
Primera B de Chile players
Segunda División Profesional de Chile players
Chilean expatriate sportspeople in Brazil
Expatriate footballers in Brazil
Association football goalkeepers